The Koolhoven F.K.55 was a Dutch fighter prototype of the 1930s, which did not progress  beyond the prototype stage.

Development

Design of a Koolhoven high-performance aircraft first started late in 1937. The result, finished in early 1938 was the F.K.55, a single-seat fighter of radical design with contra-rotating propellers and an engine housed behind the pilot. It had initially been proposed to do away with ailerons on the wings, and replace them with "slot-spoilers" for lateral control, however this idea was abandoned early in the project.

Of mixed metal and wood construction with wooden wings, the F.K.55's front fuselage was made of steel tube while wood formed the tail and rear fuselage. Its  Lorraine Pétrel engine afforded only just enough power to take off and to stay in flight. The production version would have used the more powerful  Lorraine 12R Sterna engine but this never happened.

Operational history
The aircraft flew for the first time on 30 June 1938. It flew for two minutes then landed. Underpowered, the FK.55 was cancelled in the same year.

Specifications

References

 
https://c1.staticflickr.com/7/6125/5981226518_92bc933a1e_b.jpg Shows 20 mm madsen cannon in hub.

Aircraft with contra-rotating propellers
1930s Dutch fighter aircraft
F.K.54
Mid-wing aircraft
Single-engined tractor aircraft
Aircraft first flown in 1938